Lewis Hart Weld (1875-1964) was an American entomologist, who worked for the United States Department of Agriculture (USDA).

Education
Lewis Weld attended the University of Rochester, University of Michigan, and Cornell University, where he studied entomology. In 1904, Weld went to teach at Evanston Academy, where he began his lifelong research of gall wasps.

Career
Weld made several field trips during his career; in 1919, and another from 1923 to 1924. During this time he worked for the Bureau of Entomology of the USDA. Lewis Weld resigned his official position in 1924, but continued to independently pursue his interests, and continued to collaborate with the USDA for over 40 years.

Personal life
Weld married plant pathologist Clara Octavia Jamieson in 1915; they did not have any children.

References

American entomologists
Smithsonian Institution people
1875 births
1964 deaths
University of Michigan alumni
University of Rochester alumni
Cornell University alumni